Bernardo de' Dominici or Bernardo De Dominici (13 December 1683 – c. 1759) was an Italian art historian and painter of the late-Baroque period, active mainly in Naples. As a painter he was known for his landscapes, marine vedute and genre scenes in a style characteristic of the Bamboccianti. He is now mainly known for his art historical writings and in particular the Vite dei Pittori, Scultori, ed Architetti Napolitani, a three volume collection of brief biographies of Neapolitan artists.

Life
Bernardo de' Dominici was born in Naples as the son of the painter, musician and collector Raimondo de' Dominici and Camilla Tartaglione.  He was the brother of Giampaolo, a scholar, musician and theater maker and nephew of Suor Maria, a Maltese artist.  His father was a Maltese who had been a pupil of Mattia Preti in Malta and had moved around his twentieth year to Naples.  In 1698 when he was 14 years old Bernardo`s father took him to Malta to meet Preti. He became a pupil of Preti for about seven months until his training was cut short by Preti's death in January 1699.

After his return to Naples in 1701, he dedicated himself to painting as a pupil of Francesco Solimena who trained him in landscape painting but was also a history painter influenced by Preti.  He also studied under the painter Franz Joachim Beich, a landscape painter from Ravensburg (in today's Baden-Württemberg) who was then working in Naples.  He also studied with the Dutch painter Paul Ganses, who was a specialist in moonlit seascapes.

Bernardo de' Dominici became a landscape painter who also practised the genre of the "bambocciata", a style of genre painting that depicts the everyday life of the lower classes.  He collaborated on such bambocciata with the painter Domenico Brandi.  Nothing of his output in these areas has been found which is likely explained by the fact that this was a genre practised by so many artists and was therefore not distinctive.  Dominici served for many years the duke of Laurenzana, Niccolò Gaetani dell'Aquila d'Aragona, and was the court painter of his wife Aurora Sanseverino. He also exchanged sonnets with the poet Antonio Roviglione.  He was in contact with the intellectual elite of Naples.

Art historian of Naples
In 1727, Dominici published a biography of Luca Giordano. Dominici, however, is best remembered as the Neapolitan Vasari, after publishing in 1742 an ample, yet flawed, three volume collection of brief biographies of Neapolitan artists, Vite dei Pittori, Scultori, ed Architetti Napolitani. It recounts the careers of artists from the "School of Naples," among these:

Volume I

Volume II

Volume III

Volume IV
 Fra Mattia Preti
 Pietro Ceraso, Agostino Ferraro, Aniello Perrone, Michele Perrone, and Domenico di Nardo
 Francesco Picchiatti called Picchetti; Gennaro Sacco and Arcangelo Guglielmelli
 Luca Giordano
 Giacomo Farelli
 Lorenzo Vaccaro, Lodovico Vaccaro and their disciples
 Giacomo del Po, Teresa del Po
 Paolo de Matteis and his disciples
 Gennaro Greco; Gaetano Martoriello; Michele Pagano; Giovanni Marziale; Giuseppe Tassone; Gaetano and Domenico Brandi; Carlo Moscatiello; Onofrio Naso; Pietro Capelli; and Niccolo Bonito
 Andre Belvedere
 Francesco Solimena, called Ciccio Solimena

References

1683 births
1759 deaths
17th-century Neapolitan people
17th-century Italian painters
Italian male painters
18th-century Italian painters
Painters from Naples
Italian Baroque painters
Italian art historians
18th-century Neapolitan people
18th-century Italian male artists